Jhalak Dikhhla Jaa 8 also known as Jhalak Dikhhla Jaa Reloaded is the eighth season of the dance reality show, Jhalak Dikhhla Jaa. It premiered on 11 July 2015 on Colors. The series is hosted by Manish Paul yet again. Malaika Arora (replacing Karan Johar), Shahid Kapoor, and Ganesh Hegde and Lauren Gottlieb judged the eighth season. The finale took place on 10 October 2015 declaring Faisal Khan and Vaishnavi as the winners while popular actress Sanaya Irani and Jai was the first runners-up.

Contestants & Choreographers
 Faisal Khan and Vaishnavi Patil, winners on 10 October 2015
 Sanaya Irani and Jai Kumar Nair, second place on 10 October 2015
 Shamita Shetty and Deepak Singh, third place on 10 October 2015
 Mohit Malik and Marischa Fernandes, fourth place on 10 October 2015
 Anita Hassanandani and Sanam Johar, eliminated on 3 October 2015
 Neha Marda and Rajit Dev, eliminated on 26 September 2015
 Roopal Tyagi and Rishikaysh Jogdande, eliminated on 19 September 2015
 Scarlett Wilson and Dhiraj Bakshi, eliminated on 12 September 2015
 Raftaar and Sneha Kapoor, eliminated on 5 September 2015
 Vivian Dsena and Bhawna Khanduja, eliminated on 29 August 2015
 Aashish Chaudhary and Falon Netto, eliminated on 22 August 2015
 Subhreet Kaur Ghumman and Diwakar Nayal, eliminated on 22 August 2015
 Irfan Pathan and Suchitra Sawant, quit on 22 August 2015 (For early schedule of 2015–16 Ranji Trophy)
 Radhika Madan and Rishikaysh, eliminated on 16 August 2015
 Kavita Kaushik and Rajit Dev, eliminated on 2 August 2015
 Dipika Kakar and Vaibhav Ghuge, eliminated on 25 July 2015

Score chart

green numbers indicates the highest score.
red numbers indicates the lowest score.
 indicates the winning couple.
 indicates the runner-up couple.
 indicates the second runner-up couple
 indicates the fourth-place couple
 indicates the couple eliminated that week.
 indicates the returning couple that finished in the bottom three.
n/a indicates the couple did not get any scores

Teen Ka Tadka guest partners
 Shamita & Deepak - Sanjeeda Sheikh 
 Sanaya & Jai - Drashti Dhami
 Mohit & Marischa - Gautam Gulati
 Faisal & Vaishnavi - Akshat Singh
 Anita & Sanam - Vishal Singh
 Neha & Rajit - Amruta Khanvilkar

References

External links 
 Jhalak Dikhhla Jaa 8 at Colors TV

2015 Indian television seasons
Jhalak Dikhhla Jaa seasons
Colors TV original programming